Abiul, is a Portuguese "freguesia" (Portuguese word for parish) of Pombal municipality.

Population

References

History 
During the black plague, "Abiulenses" (the name given to their locals) asked for Nossa Senhora das Neves 's help, promising an annual festive in her honour. 

The festival consists of a procession, music, local merchandise, dance, and a bullfight.

Towns in Portugal
Parishes of Pombal, Portugal